Roland Glowinski (9 March 1937 – 26 January 2022) was a French-American mathematician. He obtained his PhD in 1970 from Jacques-Louis Lions and was known for his work in applied mathematics, in particular numerical solution and applications of partial differential equations and variational inequalities. He was a member of the French Academy of Sciences and held an endowed chair at the University of Houston from 1985. Glowinski wrote many books on the subject of mathematics. In 2012, he became a fellow of the American Mathematical Society.

Selected publications
with Jacques-Louis Lions and Raymond Trémolières: Numerical Analysis of variational inequalities, North Holland 1981 2011 pbk edition
Numerical methods for nonlinear variational problems, Springer Verlag 1984, 2008; 2013 pbk edition
with Michel Fortin: Augmented Lagrangian methods : applications to the numerical solution of boundary-value problems, North Holland 1983
with Patrick Le Tallec: Augmented Lagrangian and operator-splitting methods in nonlinear mechanics, Society for Industrial and Applied Mathematics 1989
 
with Jacques-Louis Lions and Jiwen He: Exact and approximate controllability for distributed parameter systems: a numerical approach, Cambridge University Press 2008

References

External links
homepage
short biography

1937 births
2022 deaths
20th-century American mathematicians
21st-century American mathematicians
French mathematicians
Mathematical analysts
Members of the French Academy of Sciences
Fellows of the Society for Industrial and Applied Mathematics
Fellows of the American Mathematical Society
University of Houston faculty